The following lists events that happened during 1817 in Australia.

Incumbents
Monarch - George III

Governors
Governors of the Australian colonies:
Governor of New South Wales – Lachlan Macquarie
Lieutenant-Governor of Van Diemen's Land – Major Thomas Davey

Events
7 March – Bible Society of New South Wales is formed.
 8 April – Australia's first bank, the Bank of New South Wales is established.
7 October – First Methodist Church in Australia opens in Castlereagh, New South Wales.
 10 October – Bushranger Michael Howe is caught in Van Diemen's Land, but escapes after killing his captors.
 21 December – Lachlan Macquarie recommends the adoption of the name Australia for the continent instead of New Holland.
 22 December – The King expedition of 1817, to explore and make a rough survey of the northern and north-west coasts of Australia, departs Sydney.

Births
6 July – James Bonwick
25 August – Edmund Blacket

Deaths
7 December – William Bligh

References

 
Australia
Years of the 19th century in Australia